Spliatsch Castle is a ruined castle in the municipality of Surses in the Albula Region in the canton of Graubünden in Switzerland.

History
Very little is known about the early history of this castle. It was built along the important trade road that led over the Julier and Septimer Passes probably in the 12th or 13th century. A local noble family of the same name existed during that time and may have built the castle. In that case, when they died out in the early 13th century the castle was inherited by Marmels family. The earliest mention of Spliatsch is in 1193 when, at the request of the emperor, Andreas von Marmels imprisoned the papal legate Cintius there.

In 1486 the castle was inherited by Anton and Augustin de Beccaria from their mother Anna von Marmels.  However, the surrounding farm and pastures were rented out.  At that time the tower was still in good condition and the renters were required to look after it and repair the roof as needed.  It is unclear if the de Beccarias ever lived in the tower.  In the early 16th century the Marmels family reacquired the castle.  After Hans von Marmels, the last of the line, died in 1550 the castle was probably abandoned.  By the 17th century it was a ruin.

Castle site
The main entrance is located on the west side on the second story. On the inside traces of the original plaster and the chimney of a fireplace are visible. Almost nothing remains of the castle walls and outbuildings.

Gallery

See also
List of castles in Switzerland

References

Castles in Graubünden
Ruined castles in Switzerland